Albán Vermes (19 June 1957 – 3 February 2021) was a Hungarian swimmer and Olympic medalist. He participated at the 1980 Summer Olympics, winning a silver medal in 200 metre breaststroke.

Albán Vermes died on 3 February 2021, aged 63.

References

External links
 

1957 births
2021 deaths
Hungarian male swimmers
Olympic swimmers of Hungary
Olympic silver medalists for Hungary
Swimmers at the 1980 Summer Olympics
European Aquatics Championships medalists in swimming
Medalists at the 1980 Summer Olympics
Male breaststroke swimmers
Olympic silver medalists in swimming
Sportspeople from Eger